{{Infobox book series
| name             = The Unwanteds
| image            = 
| caption          = Cover of The Unwanteds, first book in the series
| books            = {{plainlist|
The Unwanteds
Island of Silence
Island of FireIsland of LegendsIsland of ShipwrecksIsland of GravesIsland of Dragons(Complete Collection )
}}
| author           = Lisa McMann
| editors          = 
| title_orig       = 
| translator       = 
| illustrator      = 
| cover_artist     = 
| country          = United States
| language         = English
| genre            = Fantasy, dystopia
| publisher        = Lisa McMann
| pub_date         = 2011–2016
| media_type       = Print, digital, audio
| number_of_books  = 7
| list_books       = 7
| oclc             = 
| preceded by      = 
| followed by      = The Unwanteds Quests
}}The Unwanteds is a dystopian fantasy book series written by Lisa McMann.

 Plots 

 Book 1: The Unwanteds 

Every year in Quill there is a tradition of sorting thirteen year olds into three categories: Wanted, Necessary and Unwanted. The strong, intelligent Wanteds go to university, Necessaries go to work in the fields,  and the worthless, artistic Unwanteds get sent to their graves.

Thirteen-year-old Alex tries his hardest to be stoic when his fate is announced as Unwanted, even while leaving behind his twin, Aaron, a Wanted. Upon arrival at the destination where he expected to be eliminated, however, Alex discovers a stunning secret--behind the mirage of the "death farm" there is instead a place called Artimè.

In Artimè, each child is taught to cultivate their creative abilities and learn how to use them magically, weaving spells through paintbrushes and musical instruments. Everything Alex has ever known changes before his eyes, and it's a wondrous transformation.

But it's a rare, unique occurrence for twins to be separated between Wanted and Unwanted, and as Alex and Aaron's bond stretches across their separation, a threat arises for the survival of Artimè that will pit Quill against Artimé in a giant, magical battle.

 Book 2: Island of Silence 

Aaron Stowe has been kicked out of the University of Quill. But, he is power-hungry. Gathering a group of sympathizers named The Restorers, he plots his rise to power, and the demise of Artimè.

Meanwhile, two silent, orange-eyed children, named Sky and Crow, have arrived on a raft. While Artimè seems to continue along normally, Eva Fathom, a supposed Restorer, is spying on Quill, and passing along information to Sean Ranger, an unwanted teenager. Plus, Mr. Today starts to teach Alex how to be a head mage, and devises a plan to trick Aaron. But, the plan backfires. Aaron confronts Mr. Today, and kills him using five heart-attack spells that Alex invented, thus depriving Artimè of its magic and leaving all magical components useless. Meanwhile, Alex and Simber, one of Mr. Today's statues, go out on a search for three of Alex's missing friends, Meghan Ranger, Samheed Burkesh, and Lani Haluki. They rescue Meghan and discover that Samheed and Lani have been captured by a neighboring, silent island, called Warbler. On the way back, Simber freezes, and crashes into the sea, because of Mr. Today's death. Alex and Meghan barely avoid death. At the same time, the Restorers attack Artimè, and causing mass hysteria. Island of silence is one of the most important books in the Unwanteds and one of the most tragic ones.

 Book 3: Island of Fire 
Appointed Head Mage by the late Mr. Today, Alex Stowe is left with the task of trying to bring back Artimé, the magical land that disappeared upon Mr. Today's death. If he can't, he and his friends are doomed. With the help of Sky, he succeeds in restoring Artimé and its magical creatures through clues Mr. Today left him, but his troubles are only beginning. Now, he must find a way to rescue his friends Lani and Samheed from Warbler Island. He rescues them, but Warbler's queen, Eagala, is planning an attack on them for stealing Sky, Crow, Lani, Samheed, and Meghan.

 Book 4: Island of Legends 
During Artimé's first annual masquerade ball, hundreds of lights appear across the sea. Artimé is under attack from Warbler, and with difficulty Alex and his friends drive them back. Meanwhile, Aaron discovers the existence of a magical jungle in Mr. Today's tube and uses the creatures to plan for an attack on Artimé. They trust him after he tells them he is Alex.

Even during the battle Alex has not forgotten his promise to rescue Sky's mother from Pirate Island. Once they set out, however, some of their friends are taken to the island's underwater holding cell by a huge eel. When they rescue all of them, they proceed onto the next islands, but find out not all of them are friendly. Karkinos or island of legends is actually a moving crab who is dying. while Talon, Lhasa, a snow lion, and Bock, a deer, are friendly, there are some who are not nice, like dropbears and the eel that attacked them. The eel does attack them and then they figure they could become allies after they see each other's fighting abilities. And after that island, beware, they sail to the edge of the world.

 Book 5: Island of Shipwrecks 
In this book Alex and his friends end up getting stuck on an island that has a constant storm after they fell off the waterfall in the Island of Legends. There they meet three scientists, who help them survive. While there they fix their boat and are able to escape. When they get back they find that Artimé went through a battle, and Meghan fought in it because she volunteered to stay behind. Samheed comes to help Meghan fight. Meghan then saved Samheed from General Blair when he miraculously survived from the first one attack, and Megan dies, saving Samheed life from General Blair. You find out in later that he joined forces with High Priest Aaron Stowe. In the book there are a few chapters that are about the pirates from the Island of Legends. They have the one slave who was good friends with Copper, Sky and Crow's mom, draw a picture of the person that helped Copper escape. He does, and they recognize him as Alex, so they raid the palace, and accidentally capture Aaron, and they then send him off to the island of shipwrecks. And they learn that they have sisters.

 Book 6: Island of Graves 
In this book, Aaron is kidnapped by the pirates from the Island of Fire. The pirates think that Aaron is Alex. After weeks in a small fishing boat tied to the back of the pirate's ship, they untie the rope and send him in the direction of the island of shipwrecks. Fortunately, he arrives in the hour of calm, but has fainted from the near-death experience. He is then rescued by Ishibashi-san, Ito-san and Sato-san. Ishibashi thinks he is Alex because Alex and Aaron are identical twins. He saves Aaron's life by giving him a piece of seaweed to eat that gives him his eternal life. Aaron slowly matures and becomes less evil and greedy over the course of his predicament. While Aaron is kidnapped, Gondoleery takes charge of Quill, and sends Liam and Alex's twin sisters to their deaths in the Ancient Sector. Liam escapes and brings the twins to Artimé. Lani then has the idea to rally up the necessaries against the new high priest, as she has started to kill necessaries and unwanteds that went to Quill in the last book. The only way that they can carry out the plan is to bring back Aaron. The only clue to where the pirates have gone is that Matilda had seen their boat go towards the east. As Alex and Sky use the Claire to go to each of the islands that Aaron could be in, they meet the queen of the ocean, a water dragon named Pan who asks them for wings but does not tell why. She says that there is no human on her island. They then reach the island that Alex had seen the help sign and the saber-toothed gorilla eat the pig, only now the sign has changed to "COME BACK" so they wait for the night and they hear a girl singing, telling them her story. But Alex does not have time to save her on the way but promises to save her on their way back. They find Aaron, rescue the girl and go back home. After rescuing her, they find Gondoleery Rattrap to be more tyrannical and cruel than they thought. The Artiméans prepare for war with the Quillens who fight for Gondoleery.

 Book 7: Island of Dragons 

In this book, Warbler (The Island of Silence) and The Island of Fire forge an alliance in order to destroy Artimé. Meanwhile, on Artimé/Quill, Quill has been obliterated by the fireballs that Gondoleery Rattrap created. Artimé expands its magical boundaries to encompass the rest of the island in order to restore Quill. A traveller from the Island of Legends informs Artimé that the island crab Karkinos, who is the Island of Legends, is on the verge of death and is drifting towards the waterfall. Henry Haluki takes the seaweed from the Island of Shipwrecks, which if consumed grants immortality, to the giant crab. Karkinos regains his strength and is able to muster the strength to back up to his original position. Meanwhile, Alex visits the Island of Dragons with the dragon Pan. Pan flies him over the colossal crystal wall surrounding the island and Alex discovers that behind the crystal wall is Pan's five children. Pan hid her children to protect them from the pirates, who capture sea creatures and cage them. Alex returns to Artimé to craft wings for the five dragons and he returns to the island to attach them to their intended hosts. Some time later, Warbler and the pirates launch their attack on Artimé. At the end of the war, Alex's left arm is damaged beyond repair (and since he is left-handed) he cannot do magic anymore. However, he remains Head Mage of Artimé. Lani's legs become immobile, and so Aaron designs her a machine to help her walk and she quickly gets used it.

 Characters 

 Main protagonists 

Alex Stowe - The main character. Twin brother to Aaron.  He becomes a powerful fighter and is injured in the last book.

Aaron - Alex's twin brother.  Aaron is initially an antagonist, but gradually comes to support Artimé. He helps the Unwanteds soon after being rescued by Alex on the Island of Shipwrecks.

Samheed Burkesh - Strong student who at first resents Alex, blaming him for his own Unwanted designation, but eventually becomes his best friend.

Lani Haluki - Child of Senior Governor Haluki, a double agent. Younger than the others, Lani was Purged when she was only 12 years old. Resentful of this fact until she learns her father, already knowing about Artimé, had it done to get her out of Quill. Interested in books and one of Artimé's finest students. Alex falls for her in the first book.

Marcus Today - The Head Mage and creator of Artimé. Mr. Today created Artimé and its magical creatures to save his daughter and the other young Unwanteds from death. He is also the twin of evil High Priest Justine. Later, Mr. Today tragically dies by Aaron, Alex's twin brother.

Claire Morning -Mr. Today's daughter and instructor for the students who show a talent for singing. She was kidnapped by Aaron Stowe in the second book after she saw her father die.

Simber - An animated statue of a winged cheetah made of hardened sand. Simber is one of the protectors of Artimé, and is loyal to the head mage. He was the first statue Mr.Today created.

Florence - An animated statue of a warrior made of ebony, who also protects Artimé. Near the end of the series she falls for a winged, bronze man named Talon.

Meghan Ranger - One of Alex's friends who loves music and singing. 

Mr. Sigfried Appleblossom - Artimé's Theater instructor, he always attempts to talk in iambic pentameter and rhyme every sentence. He dies in the seventh book. It was said that he was like a father to Samheed Burkesh.

Sky - A girl from Warbler Island who Alex falls for. Aaron also fell for her in the third book after Aaron got into Artimé and saw her pacing anxiously waiting for Alex.

Crow - Sky's little brother and a friend of Henry Haluki.

Henry Haluki - Crow's friend and Lani's little brother. He was the first one to know Crow's and Sky's name.

Kaylee Jones - A girl from our world, who stumbles into theirs from what she said was the Dragon's Triangle. She used to live on the Island of Graves before she was saved by Alex, Sky, and Aaron after Alex and Sky rescued Aaron from the Island of Shipwrecks.

Ito - A scientist from the island of shipwrecks who came from Japan.

Sato - Another scientist on the island of shipwrecks who also came from Japan.

Ishibashi Junpei - The last scientist from the island of shipwrecks who also came from Japan. Speaks English, unlike Ito and Sato.

 Main antagonists 
High priest Justine - The high priestess of Quill. Lani soon kills her in the battle between Quill and Artime. She is also Marcus' evil twin unlike Aaron and Alex

Gondoleery - The new high priestess of Quill after Aaron was kidnapped by pirates from the Island of Shipwrecks in the fifth book. Aaron kills her with the deadly scatter clip that he is famous for.

Queen Eagala - The queen of Warbler. Everyone thinks they killed her when she goes down in the volcano, but then shows up in Dragon Captives.

 Secondary characters 

Eva Fathom - mother of Carina Fathom, the secretary to Aaron and a spy for Artimé

Copper - Sky and Crow's mother who was saved from pirate island and later became the Queen of Warbler Island

Scarlet - a Warbleran that escaped the first time Warbler attacked Artimé. She is a seasoned fighter and Crow has a crush on her.

Thatcher - another Warbleran that escaped the first time Warbler attacked Artimé. He is a seasoned fighter and has a friendship with Scarlet.

Thisbe Stowe - Alex's sister.

 Reception 
In a review by Kirkus, The Unwanteds is noted as a cross between The Hunger Games'' and Harry Potter. Kirkus further notes that "blending elements from two popular genres", ensures that the books will be popular with readers drawn to stories of dystopian fantasy.

Film Adaptation 
In November 2019 Warner Bros. purchased the film rights to the series. Filming is yet to be scheduled due to COVID-19.

References

External links 
 
 http://articles.latimes.com/2011/aug/28/entertainment/la-ca-lisa-mccann-20110828
 http://www.mlive.com/living/grand-rapids/index.ssf/2011/10/holland_natives_new_book_the_u.html

Book series introduced in 2011
American fantasy novels
Mark Twain Awards